Elec. Jazz is an album by James Blood Ulmer's Music Revelation Ensemble recorded in 1990 and released on the Japanese DIW label featuring performances by Ulmer with David Murray, Amin Ali and Cornell Rochester.

Reception
The Allmusic review by Brian Olewnick states, "Essentially James "Blood" Ulmer's band, the Music Revelation Ensemble both harks back to his early recorded history with saxophonist David Murray and seeks to update the guitarist's unique fusion of funk, out jazz, and hardcore blues... Ulmer, of course, is sui generis, and his playing here, in all its raggedness, grit, and clarity, is arguably some of the best he ever put to disc. Forget the insipid album title. Elec. Jazz contains some fine, tough music and is well-worth seeking out".

Track listing
All compositions by James Blood Ulmer
 "Exit" - 5:27  
 "Inter City" - 6:40  
 "Big Top" - 5:45  
 "No More" - 8:22  
 "Big Top Part 2" - 6:46  
 "Taps Dance" - 10:32  
 "Exit Part 2" - 6:44

Personnel
James Blood Ulmer - guitar
David Murray - tenor saxophone
Amin Ali - electric bass
Cornell Rochester - drums

References 

1990 albums
James Blood Ulmer albums
David Murray (saxophonist) albums
DIW Records albums